Lyderhorn is a mountain in the city of Bergen in Vestland county, Norway. It is one of "De syv fjell", the seven mountains surrounding the city centre, and the starting location of Bergen Turlag's annual trip of the mountains. Due to its prominent visibility from the seas, it has historically been a navigational mark for sailors. North of Ørnafjellet is Kvarven fort, a strategic point during World War II, still featuring several bunkers and cannon positions used in the defense of Bergen. Lyderhorn, Ørnafjellet and Kvarven are popular hiking areas.

Folklore has it that Lyderhorn was a gathering location for witches on Midsummer night, Valborg night (the night of May 1), and at Yule.

See also
List of mountains of Norway

References

Mountains of Bergen